The Department of Lima is a department and region located in the central coast of Peru; the seat of the regional government is Huacho.

Lima Province, which contains the city of Lima, the country's capital, is located west of the Department of Lima; this province is autonomous and not under the jurisdiction of the regional government.

Geography

The department of Lima is bordered by the departments of Ancash on the north, Huánuco, Pasco, and Junín on the east, Huancavelica on the southeast, Ica on the south, and the Pacific Ocean and the Lima Province on the west.

The department has a coastal and an Andean zone, and has a great diversity of natural regions: the Coast or Chala (0 to 500 meters above sea level) up to the Janka or Mountain range (over 4800 meters). The predominating regions are the Yunga (500 to 2300 meters above sea level) and Quechua (2300 to 3500 meters)

Points of interest

Lachay National Reserve

The Lachay National Reserve, in the Huaura province, is a unique mist-fed eco-system of wild plant and animal species, is a natural reserve located in the north of the department.

Huacho - The capital of the Lima Region 
Huacho, the capital of the Region Lima and the most populated city of the department (excluding Lima that is administrated by an autonomous government, the Metropolitan Municipality of Lima). Sitting at the bottom of a wide bay, it has a pleasant and dry climate. In its vicinity, the Huaura River - is where rice, cotton, sugar cane and different fruits and cereals are grown. This has given rise to an important cotton industry as well as soap and oil factories.

Lunahuaná
The Incahuasi Archeological complex is located there. Lunahuaná has a dry climate and the sun shines during most of the year. Lately, Lunahuaná has become an adventure sports paradise, such as: Canotaje (Whitewater Rafting), Parapente & Ala Delta. Whitewater rafting is possible due to the Cañete River, which has rapids up to level 4. The main settlement in this district is the town of Lunahuaná.

History

The remains of early Andean inhabitants, hunters and harpoon fishermen from more than 6500 years ago, are to be found in the department of Lima. These remains were found in Chivateros, near the Chillón River, and in various other places. These persons incorporated nets, hooks, farming, ceramics and weaving to their everyday objects. The inhabitants of the coast lived in the lomas and the valleys, where they built temples and dwelling complexes, leading to huge ceremonial centres, such as the Huacoy on the Chillón River; Garagay and La Florida on the Rímac River, Manchay on the Lurín River; and Chancay, Supe and many other valleys to the north and south. There are finely ornamented temples with figures modelled in clay.

Lithic prehistoric projectile points of Paijan type were found at Ancón, 40 kilometres northeast of Lima in the Chillón River Valley.

The 5,000-year-old ruins known as El Paraíso are also located in this area. A temple at the site is believed to be about 5,000 years old.

In 2006, a team of archeological researchers led by Robert Benfer announced their findings from a four-year excavation at Buena Vista in the Chillón River valley a few kilometres north of present-day Lima. They had discovered a 4200-year-old observatory constructed by an early Andean civilization, a three-dimensional sculpture, unique for the time period in this region, and sophisticated carvings. The observatory is on top of a 10-meter pyramidal mound and has architectural features for sighting the astronomical solstices. The discovery pushes back the time for the development of complex civilisation in the area and has altered scholars' understanding of Preceramic period cultures in Peru.

The Lima culture (100 A.D. to 650 A.D.) arose in this area, specially in the central valleys from Chancay to Lurín. It was distinguished by painted adobe buildings.

During this time, the Huari conquest took place, thus giving rise to Huari-style ceramics, together with a local style known as Nievería. As the population grew, their culture changed. With the decline of the Huari, whose most important center was Cajamarquilla, new local cultures arose.  The Chancay are the most well-known. They developed large urban centers and a considerable textile production, as well as mass-produced ceramics.

At this stage in the mid-15th century, the Incas arrived from their base in the Andes. They conquered and absorbed the regional cultures and occupied important sites such as Pachacamac, turning it into an administrative centre.

Political divisions 
The department is divided into nine  provinces, which are composed of 171 districts.

Barranca (Barranca)
Cajatambo (Cajatambo)
Cañete (San Vicente de Cañete)
Canta (Canta)
Huaral (Huaral)
Huarochirí (Matucana)
Huaura (Huacho)
Oyón (Oyón)
Yauyos (Yauyos)

Places of interest
 Caral
Lachay Hill's
Nor Yauyos-Cochas Landscape Reserve

References

External links
Lima Region Information Hub – Lima Region Information Hub official website
Lima Region Tourism Board – Lima Region Tourism Board (CEPTUR) official website
North Lima Region – Lima Region: Social, Cultural and Tourist Information
Lima Travel Guide – General facts and travel information about Lima
Gobierno Regional Lima – Lima Regional Government official website

Regions of Peru